Dissiliaria is a genus of plants under the family Picrodendraceae described as a genus in 1867.

The entire genus is endemic to the State of Queensland.

Species
 Dissiliaria baloghioides F.Muell. ex Baill
 Dissiliaria indistincta P.I.Forst. 
 Dissiliaria laxinervis Airy Shaw
 Dissiliaria muelleri Baill.
 Dissiliaria surculosa P.I.Forst.
 Dissiliaria tuckeri P.I.Forst.

Formerly included
Dissiliaria tricornis Benth. - Choriceras tricorne (Benth.) Airy Shaw

See also
Taxonomy of the Picrodendraceae

References

Picrodendraceae
Flora of Queensland
Malpighiales genera
Taxa named by Henri Ernest Baillon
Taxa named by Ferdinand von Mueller